Symmetry Spire is located in the Teton Range, Grand Teton National Park in the U.S. state of Wyoming.  The mountain, first climbed via the east ridge route on August 20, 1929, by Fritiof Fryxell and Phil Smith, towers above the northwest shore of Jenny Lake and Cascade Canyon. The scenic Lake of the Crags, a cirque lake or tarn, is located northwest of the summit and is accessed by way of Hanging Canyon. Popular with mountaineers, the spire has numerous challenging cliffs.

References

Mountains of Grand Teton National Park
Mountains of Wyoming
Mountains of Teton County, Wyoming